is a passenger railway station located in the city of Kameoka, Kyoto Prefecture, Japan, operated by West Japan Railway Company (JR West). It is on the border with Nishikyō-ku, Kyoto.

Lines

Station layout
The station consists of two opposed elevated side platforms. The station is unattended.

Platforms

History
It was originally located in the site of the present Torokko Hozukyō Station on the Sagano Scenic Railway. With the privatization of the Japan National Railways (JNR) on 1 April 1987, the station came under the aegis of the West Japan Railway Company. The station was moved to the present location on 5 March 1989, when the new route of the Sanin Main Line was opened. The old railway track and the closed station was revived as the Sagano Scenic Railway and its stop on 27 April 1991.

Station numbering was introduced in March 2018 with Hozukyō being assigned station number JR-E09.

Passenger statistics
In fiscal 2019, the station was used by an average of 358 passengers daily.

Surrounding area
 Hozukyō Gorge
 Torokko Hozukyō Station

Gallery

See also
List of railway stations in Japan

References

External links

 0610705 Station Official Site

Railway stations in Kyoto Prefecture
Sanin Main Line
Railway stations in Japan opened in 1936
Kameoka, Kyoto